Also known as Friedhof Fluntern, the Fluntern Cemetery is located in the Zürichberg district of Zürich.

Notable interments
 Emil Abderhalden (1877–1950), Swiss biochemist and physiologist
 Johann Ludwig Aberli (1723–1786), Swiss artist
 Anita Augspurg (1857–1943), German lawyer, actor, writer and feminist
 Nora Barnacle (1884–1951), wife of James Joyce
 Elias Canetti (1905–1994), Bulgarian-born modernist novelist, playwright
 Therese Giehse (1898–1975), German actress
 Friedrich Hegar (1841–1927), Swiss composer, conductor, violinist
 James Joyce (1882–1941), Irish novelist and poet
 Paul Karrer (1889–1971), Swiss organic chemist, won the Nobel Prize for Chemistry in 1937
 Warja Lavater (1913–2007), Swiss writer
 Albert Meyer (1870–1953), Swiss politician
 Karl Moser (1860–1936), Swiss architect
 Wilhelm Oechsli (1851–1919), Swiss historian
 Leopold Ružička (1887–1976), Croatian scientist, winner of the 1939 Nobel Prize in Chemistry
 Max Rychner (1897–1965), Swiss journalist and author
 Paul Scherrer  (1890–1969), Swiss physicist
 Léopold Szondi (1893–1986), Hungarian psychiatrist
 Péter Szondi (1929–1971), Hungarian literary scholar
 Sigmund Widmer (1919–2003), Swiss historian, writer and politician

References

External links
 

Cemeteries in Switzerland
Buildings and structures in Zürich
Tourist attractions in Zürich